Wandering Girl (original title: Niña Errante) is a 2018 Colombian film directed by Rubén Mendoza. Mendoza's fourth feature, the coming-of-age road movie made its world premiere as part of the Official Selection and won Grand Prix for Best Film and Best Music at the 2018 Tallinn Black Nights Film Festival.

Plot
Teenage Angela (Sofía Paz Jara) meets her three adult half-sisters (Carolina Ramírez, Lina Marcela Sánchez, María Camila Mejia) for the first time when their father dies. Fearing that Angela will end up in state care, they embark on a 900 miles journey across Colombia to leave Angela with an aunt she has never even met.

Cast
 Sofía Paz Jara as Ángela
 Carolina Ramírez as Carolina
 Lina Marcela Sánchez as Paula
 María Camila Mejía as Gabriela

Awards and nominations

References

External links

2018 films
Colombian drama films
2010s Spanish-language films
Films shot in Colombia
Films set in Colombia
2010s Colombian films